The following is a timeline of the history of the city of Alexandria, Egypt.

Greek era (331–30 BC)

 331 BC – Rhacotis renamed "Alexandria" by Alexander the Great (approximate date).
 330 BC – Cleomenes of Naucratis appointed Governor of Egypt by Alexander, begins to turn the small village into the Capitol of Egypt.

323–30 BC  
Egypt's capital under Ptolemaic dynasty
 323 BC – Alexander dies. Ptolemy I Soter appointed "Satrap" of Egypt.
 305 BC – Ptolemy I proclaims himself king.
 283 BC – Library of Alexandria opens (approximate date).
 247 BC – Lighthouse of Alexandria built (approximate date).
 170 BC – Seleucid "Emperor" Antiochus IV Epiphanes briefly conquers Egypt
 168 BC – First Roman intervention. City briefly invaded.
 1st century BC – Caesareum built.

48 BC–365 AD Romans in power 
 48 BC – Julius Caesar conquers Alexandria.
 48 BC – Great Royal Library of Alexandria burned.
 47 BC – Siege of Alexandria.
 47 BC – Caesar victorious.
 44 BC – Assassination of Julius Caesar in Rome.
 40 BC – Cleopatra VII marries Roman triumvir Mark Antony.
 31 BC – Death of Antony and Cleopatra.
 30 BC – Battle of Alexandria.
 29 BC – Augustus takes city. Cornelius Gallus first prefect of Egypt.
 25 BC – Strabo, the Greek geographer and philosopher, visits Alexandria.
 19 AD – Germanicus resident in city.

 38 AD – Pogrom against Jews.
 115 AD – City sacked during a Jewish revolt. Possible genocide.
 122 AD – Hadrian rebuilds city.
 175 AD – Failed revolution of Avidius Cassius.
 176 AD – Catechetical School of Alexandria (oldest such school in the world) founded. Some records say 190 AD; see article.
 297 AD – Pompey's Pillar built.
 365 AD – The 365 Crete earthquake affects the Greek island of Crete with a maximum Mercalli intensity of XI (Extreme), causing a destructive tsunami that affects the coasts of Libya and Egypt, especially Alexandria. Many thousands were killed.

Byzantine rule 390–650

 391 – Theodosius I orders destruction of pagan temples.
 395 – Roman Empire formally split in two. The official start of so-called Byzantine Empire.
 415 – Lynching of the philosopher Hypatia by a radical Christian mob. The expulsion of the Jews from Alexandria, in 414 or 415 under the leadership of Saint Cyril. Around 100,000 Jews expelled—another Pogrom or "Alexandria Expulsion".
 619 – City besieged; Sassanid Persians in power.
 641–642 – City besieged; Arabs in power; capital of Egypt relocates from Alexandria to Fustat.
 645 – Byzantines back in power.
 646 – Arabs back in power, following the Battle of Nikiou

Muslim Rule 700–1800
 680 – Saint Mark's Coptic Orthodox Cathedral rebuilt.
 956 – Earthquake.
 1303 – Earthquake.
 1323 – Earthquake. The Pharos lighthouse collapses.
 1354 – Eliyahu Hanavi Synagogue built.
 1365 – October: City besieged by Cypriot forces.
 1381 – Zaradel Synagogue established
 1477 – Citadel of Qaitbay established.
 1519 – Ottoman conquest
 1775 – El-Mursi Abul Abbas Mosque built.
 1798 – French forces under Napoleon Bonaparte besiege and conquer what is now just a town.
 1800 – Nadir of the city. Population: a mere 8,000.

19th century
 1801
 21 March: Battle between French and British forces.
 17 August – 2 September: City besieged by British forces.
 2 September: Capitulation to British.
 1807
 7 March - September 25: City occupied by the British forces
 1819 – Mahmoudiyah Canal constructed.
 1821 – Population: 12,528.
 1829 – Dockyard and arsenal open.
 1833 – April: Luxor Obelisk shipped to Paris.
 1834 – Ras el-Tin Palace construction begins.
 1840 – Population: 60,000.
 1847 – Ras el-Tin Palace built.
 1850 – Eliyahu Hanavi Synagogue restored.
 1853 – Azouz Synagogue rebuilt.
 1856
 Cairo-Alexandria railway begins operating.
 Cathedral of Evangelismos dedicated.
 1859
 Institut d'Egypte founded.
 Theatre Europeen reopens.
 1860 – Alexandria Ramleh Train Station established.
 1862 – Theatre Zizinia built.
 1861 – Cotton boom.
 1863
 Horse-drawn trams begin operating.
 Population: 170,000.
 1865 – Gas lighting introduced.
 1865–1869 – New port created.
 1872 – Population c. 200,000 (ca. 20% foreigners).
 1873
 Breakwater built in harbour.
 Statue unveiled in Midan Muhammad Ali.
 1875 – Al-Ahram newspaper begins publication.
 1877 – One of Cleopatra's Needles shipped to London.
 1880 – The Egyptian Gazette launched in Alexandria.
 1880 – One of Cleopatra's Needles shipped to New York City.
 1880 – Zaradel Synagogue restored.
 1881 – al-Tankit wa al-Tabkit newspaper begins publication.
 1882
 11 July: Anti-European riots; city bombarded by British naval forces.
 Population: 232,626.
 1883 – Alexandria Stock Exchange founded.
 1887 – El-Hakaneia Palace built.
 1892
 Graeco-Roman Museum established.
 Salamlek Palace built.

20th century

 1901 – Green Synagogue established.
 1902
 Electric trams begin operating.
 Victoria College founded.
 1903 – Khedivial yacht club built.
 1905 – Sea wall constructed.
 1907 – Population: 332,246.
 1910 – Hellenic Football Club Alexandria formed.
 1910 – Sasson Synagogue established.
 1914 – Al Ittihad Alexandria Club formed.
 1917 – Population c. 460,000 (c. 20% foreigners).
 1919 – Princess Fatma Al-Zahra palace built.
 1920 – Castro Synagogue established.
 1920 – Nezah Israel Synagogue established.
 1921 – Alexandria Opera House opens.
 1922 – Shaaré Tefila Synagogue established.
 1925 – Scottish School for Girls founded.
 1927 – Population c. 600,000 (ca. 17% foreigners).
 1928 – Collège Saint Marc founded.
 1929
 Alexandria Stadium opens.
 English Boys' School established.
 1930 – Alexandria Aquarium opens.
 1932 – Al-Haramlik Palace built.
 1934 – Corniche constructed.
 1935 – English Girls College founded.
 1937 – Eliahou Hazan Synagogue established.
 1938 – Publication of The Egyptian Gazette moved from Alexandria to Cairo.
 1941 – 19 December: Conflict between Italian and British naval forces.
 1942 – Farouk University established.
 1947 – Population: 919,024; (c. 11% foreigners).
 1950 – Hassab hospital established.
 1952 – Egyptian coup d'état.
 1954 – 26 October: Alleged assassination attempt of Nasser during speech in Mansheya.
 1958 – Alexandria Zoo opens.
 1960 – Siddiq Abdul-Latif becomes mayor.
 1964 – September: Arab League summit held.
 1965 – Population c. 1.5 million.
 1969 – St. Takla Haymanot's Church consecrated.
 1974 – Population: 2,259,000.
 1980 – El Alamein-Alexandria highway constructed.
 1986
 Ismail El-Gawsaqi becomes mayor.
 Port of Dekheila constructed.
 Royal Jewelry Museum inaugurated.
 1990 – Senghor University founded.
 1992 – Population: 3,380,000 (estimate).
 1996 – Alexandria Institute Of Technology founded.
 1997 – Abdel-Salam El-Mahgoub becomes mayor.
 1999 – Swedish Institute Alexandria established.

21st century

 2001 – Alexandria Center of Arts opens.
 2002
 Bibliotheca Alexandrina inaugurated.
 City named World Book Capital by UNESCO.
 2003
 Harras El-Hedoud Stadium opens.
 Alexandria National Museum inaugurated.
 2006
 Adel Labib becomes mayor.
 January–February: 2006 Africa Cup of Nations held.
 Population: 4,110,015.
 Pharos University established.
 2007
 Borg El Arab Stadium opens.
 San Stefano Grand Plaza built.
 2009 – Sadat Museum inaugurated.
 2010 – Population: 4,358,439.
 2011
 Egyptian revolution
 1 January: Bombing of Saints Church.
 2012 – Protests against state president Mohamed Morsi.
 2013 – January: Anti-Morsi protests.
 2017 – Population: 5,163,750 (urban agglomeration).

See also
 History of Alexandria
 List of mayors of Alexandria since 1960 (in French)
 Of Alexandria
 Timelines of other cities in Egypt: Cairo, Port Said

References

This article incorporates information from the French Wikipedia and the German Wikipedia.

Bibliography

Published in 18th–19th century
 
 
 
 
 
 
 
 
 
 
 
 
 

Published in 20th century
 
 
 
 
 
 
  
 
 
 
 
 

Published in 21st century
 
 
 
 
  (about Alexandria, Jaffa, Salonika, Smyrna)

External links

   (Bibliography of open access  articles)
  (Images, etc.)
  (Images, etc.)
  (Images, etc.)
  (Bibliography)
  (Bibliography)
  (Bibliography)

Alexandria
Alexandria-related lists
Years in Egypt